Twitch is the third studio album by Canadian hard rock musician Aldo Nova, released on October 14, 1985 by Portrait Records.

Track listing
Credits adapted from the album liner notes.

Personnel
Aldo Nova  – guitar, vocals, synthesizer and linn drum programming, producer, arranger
Paul Kayen – guitars
Neil Jason – bass
Anton Fig – drums on "Heartless"
Billy Carmassi – drums on "Lay Your Love on Me"
Allan Schwartzberg – drums on "Fallen Angel"
Lennie Petze – special effects guitar on "Long Hot Summer", castanets on "Surrender Your Heart", co-producer
Michael Rudetsky played and programmed the fairlight on "Long Hot Summer" and "Twitch"
Robbie Kilgore – additional synthesizers on "Long Hot Summer"
David LeBolt – additional keyboards on "Surrender Your Heart", "Fallen Angel" and "Stay"
Peppy Castro – background vocals
Michael Bolton – background vocals
Bob Christianson – background vocals
Angela Clemmons – background vocals on "Rumours of You", "Surrender Your Heart" and "If Looks Could Kill"
Fiona – background vocals on "Rumours of You", "Surrender Your Heart" and "Lay Your Love on Me"

Production
Brian McGee – engineer, mixing
Joe Chiofalo – assistant engineer
Michael Abbott – assistant engineer
Dwight Druick – vocal coordination
Tom Santorelli – head technician
Robert Cohen – photography
Marl Larson – design

References

Aldo Nova albums
1985 albums
Albums produced by Aldo Nova
Portrait Records albums